Illinois Route 122 (IL 122) is a  east–west highway in the U.S. state of Illinois. Its western terminus is at a junction with IL 29 west of Delavan. It runs east to a junction with IL 9 in McLean County west of Bloomington.

Route description

Illinois Route 122 begins at Illinois Route 29, 5 miles west of Delavan.  The highway travels east through Delavan.  Five miles east of Delavan, the highway makes a 3-mile northbound concurrency with Interstate 155.  After its concurrency with Interstate 155, the highway travels mainly east, passing along the north sides of Hopedale, Minier, and Stanford.  East of Stanford, the highway shifts direction and travels due north for 4 miles.  The highway then continues east for less than one mile to its eastern terminus at Illinois Route 9.
This route serves the Tazewell County city of Delavan and the villages of Hopedale and Minier.  It also serves the McLean County village of Stanford.

History 
SBI Route 122 ran from Havana at the Illinois River to Bloomington on what was Illinois Route 9, Illinois 122, Illinois Route 29 and U.S. Route 136. By 1937, the routing of Illinois 122 had been settled.

Major intersections

References 

122
U.S. Route 136
Transportation in McLean County, Illinois
Transportation in Tazewell County, Illinois